Karpa is a surname. Notable people with this surname include:

 Dave Karpa (born 1971), Canadian ice hockey player
 Irena Karpa (born 1980), Ukrainian writer and singer
 Natalka Karpa (born 1980), Ukrainian singer
 Uwe Karpa (born 1945), German actor

See also
 
Karra (name)